Ouassim Oumaiz (born 30 March 1999) is a Spanish long-distance runner. He is the Spanish national record holder in the 5km road race with a time of 13:19, which he set in 2020 at the Seven Hills 5K Invitational. He also won the Cross de Atapuerca cross-country race in 2019.

References

1999 births
Living people
Spanish male long-distance runners
Sportspeople from the Province of Málaga